William Patrick "Mickey" Devine (May 9, 1892 – October 1, 1937) was a backup catcher in Major League Baseball who played for three different teams between  and . He was born in Albany, New York.

Devine entered the majors in 1918 with the Philadelphia Phillies, playing for them one year before joining the Boston Red Sox (1920) and New York Giants (1925). His most productive came with the 1925 Giants, when he posted a .273 batting average with four runs batted in in 33 games – all career-highs.

In a three season-career, Devine was a .226 hitter (12-for-53) with seven runs and four RBI in 33 games, including four doubles and one stolen base with no home runs.

Devine died at his home of Albany, New York at the age of 45.

External links

Retrosheet

1892 births
1937 deaths
Major League Baseball catchers
Philadelphia Phillies players
Boston Red Sox players
New York Giants (NL) players
Baseball players from New York (state)
Sportspeople from Albany, New York
Minor league baseball managers
New Haven Murlins players
New London Planters players
Minneapolis Millers (baseball) players
Toledo Iron Men players
Pittsfield Hillies players
Toronto Maple Leafs (International League) players
Newark Bears (IL) players
Rochester Tribe players
Buffalo Bisons (minor league) players
Baltimore Orioles (IL) players
Jersey City Skeeters players
Columbus Senators players